Mohamed Shemais (died 15 September 1976) was an Egyptian footballer. He competed in the men's tournament at the 1928 Summer Olympics.

References

External links
 
 

Year of birth missing
1976 deaths
Egyptian footballers
Egypt international footballers
Olympic footballers of Egypt
Footballers at the 1928 Summer Olympics
Place of birth missing
Association football midfielders